Maximiliano Gastón López (born 3 April 1984) is an Argentine former professional footballer who played as a second striker. He holds both an Argentine and an Italian passport. He is known as El Rubio ("The Blonde"), and La Gallina de Oro ("The Golden Hen").

Formed at River Plate, he spent most of his career in Italy, making 215 Serie A appearances and scoring 46 goals for Catania, A.C. Milan, Sampdoria, Chievo, Torino and Udinese. He also played in Spain for Barcelona and Mallorca, winning the La Liga and UEFA Champions League double with the former in 2006, and for Grêmio and Vasco da Gama in the Campeonato Brasileiro Série A.

Club career

River Plate
López began his career in 1997 with River Plate. On 19 August 2001, at age 17, he made his senior debut, against Talleres de Córdoba. That same season, he was officially promoted to the senior squad following five years with the youth program. With River Plate, he was a standout striker and the club won the Torneo Clausura in 2002, 2003 and 2004. With River Plate, he made 56 appearances, scoring 13 goals.

Barcelona
In January 2005, Barcelona signed López on a 4-year contract for €6.2 million following an injury to striker Henrik Larsson. On his UEFA Champions League debut on 23 February, he came on as a second-half substitute for Ludovic Giuly and within four minutes beat Chelsea defender William Gallas to score an equaliser with his first shot for the club, an eventual 2–1 first-leg win. His only other goal for the club came in a Copa del Rey tie against Zamora on 11 January 2006. López failed to break into the club's first team; in his two seasons in La Liga, he made just 14 league appearances.

Mallorca, Moscow and Grêmio
López transferred to Mallorca on loan for the 2006–07 season, with the deal not including a purchasing option. He scored 3 goals in 25 matches, and returned to Barcelona in the summer of 2007, only to be sold to FC Moscow on 16 August 2007 after a €2 million transfer fee was agreed by the clubs. With Moscow, López made 22 league appearances and scored 9 goals. 

On 13 February 2009, Brazilian club Grêmio signed López on a season-long loan. He made his debut the following month in a game against Santa Cruz. His first goal for the club came against São José-PA on 18 March 2009. López scored four goals in the 2009 Copa Libertadores and the winner in the centenary Gre-Nal derby match.

Catania

On 20 January 2010, López transferred to Catania for a €3 million transfer fee, signing a contract lasting until 30 June 2013. He made his Serie A debut on 31 January, [24] playing 55 minutes in the match against the Udinese. In the next match, away to Lazio (0–1), he scored his first goal and the match-winner for the Rossazzurri. On 3 April, he scored his first brace in the Italian top flight during the Sicilian derby against Palermo. He closed the season in double figures, scoring 11 goals in 17 appearances and contributed to the safety of the Etnei in Serie A.

The following season, López scored his first goal in a 2–0 home victory against Cesena on 22 September 2010. At the end of the season, he had scored 8 goals in 35 appearances, finishing 12th in the Serie A table with Catania.

In the 2011–12 season, López scored his first goal on 18 September 2011, converting a penalty against Cesena. On 18 December 2011, in the match won 2–0 by Catania against Palermo, he converted his second penalty of the season and was tearfully substituted by Gonzalo Bergessio for a possible farewell before the winter session of the transfer window.

Loan to A.C. Milan
On 27 January 2012, López was officially transferred to A.C. Milan in a €1.5 million loan move, with a buying option set at €8 million. He signed a contract with Milan until 30 June 2015 to receive €700,000 until the end of the 2011–12 season and €1.5 million per year for the following three seasons. He chose the number 21 shirt.

López scored his first goal as a Milan player on 11 February 2012 in an away game against Udinese, equalising for Milan before going on to assist Stephan El Shaarawy to score the game-winning goal. However, at the end of the season, he returned to Catania after Milan opted not to exercise their buying option.

Loan to Sampdoria
On 11 July, López joined Sampdoria on a season-long loan deal from Catania.

López returned to Catania from a loan spell for the duration of the 2013–14 season and on 28 January 2014, he rejoined Sampdoria on loan for the remainder of the Serie A campaign. He scored a winning goal in his first match back for Sampdoria against Genoa on 3 February 2014.

Chievo
On 30 June 2014, López signed a one-year deal with Chievo with an option to extend his contract for a further year after Catania relegation. He made his debut on the first day of the 2014–15 Serie A season, 30 August, against Juventus, playing the full 90 minutes of a 1–0 home loss. In his second match, on 14 September, he scored the only goal as Chievo defeated Napoli.

Torino
On 13 January 2015, López joined Torino, signing a six-month contract with an option for another year. He debuted the next day against Lazio in the second round of the Coppa Italia. On 18 January, he scored his first goal for Torino, against Cesena in a 3–2 Torino victory. On 19 February, he scored a brace during the UEFA Europa League round of 32 against Athletic Bilbao, therefore managing to score in five different leagues (Argentine, Spanish, Russian, Brazilian and Italian) and in all international competitions (Copa Libertadores, Copa Sudamericana, Champions League and Europa League). He scored again in the victorious return leg in Spain seven days later, then the 28th round of the league away at Parma. On 17 May, he scored his first brace for Torino in Serie A in the 2–0 victory over his former club Chievo.

After renewing for another year, on 24 November 2015 López signed a new contract with Torino lasting until 2018.

Vasco de Gama
On 14 July 2018, López joined Vasco da Gama, signing an eighteen-month contract with an option for another year. He debuted against São Paulo. On 27 August, he scored his first goal for Vasco against Chapecoense in a 3–1 Vasco victory and also had two assists, winning man of the match honors. After 14 matches he had great displays, with 7 goals and 6 assists, being considered the best Vasco player in the second semester and becoming the supporters favorite.

Return to Italy
On 23 August 2019, López return to Italy in Serie B club Crotone for free. He signed a one-year contract.

On 10 August 2020, he signed a one-year contract with Serie C club Sambenedettese.

International career
López represented his birth nation of Argentina at under-15, under-17 and under-20 levels, also taking part to the 2003 South American Youth Championship. He was eligible for both Argentina and Italy, as he holds both citizenships and has never represented any national team at senior level. In July 2010, he explicitly stated he might accept a call-up from the Azzurri.

Personal life
López was married to Argentine model Wanda Nara from 2008 to 2013. The couple have three sons, Valentino Gastón (born 25 January 2009), Constantino (born 19 December 2010) and Benedicto (born 20 February 2012). Nara and López split after her affair with López's former Sampdoria teammate Mauro Icardi, now with Galatasaray, was exposed. López had previously been good friends with Icardi, inviting his countryman on vacations and opening his home to Icardi when he first moved to Italy. She and López began divorce proceedings in December 2013. Nara and Icardi subsequently married on 27 May 2014. During the April 2014 Serie A match between Sampdoria and Inter, López notably refused to shake Icardi's hand, leading the press to dub the game the "Wanda derby".

López's change of luck from being a somewhat criticised forward at River Plate to being signed by Barcelona made him an internet meme in his native Argentina. Satirical blogs were created lobbying for his inclusion in the Argentinian squad for the 2006 FIFA World Cup. After the Argentinian elimination from the World Cup, without López getting any caps at all, the nature of the meme changed to a series of reasons explaining his lack of time play on Barcelona with hyperbolic claims which closely resembled Chuck Norris Facts. In interviews, López has stated that he is "okay" with this unexpected following.

López and fashion industry businessman Paul Richardson led a consortium interested in buying English Championship club Birmingham City. They pulled out of any prospective deal in December 2022, citing a lack of agreement on revised terms.

Career statistics

Club

Honours
River Plate
Torneo Clausura: 2001–02, 2002–03, 2003–04

Barcelona
 UEFA Champions League: 2005–06
 La Liga: 2004–05, 2005–06
 Supercopa de España: 2005

Vasco da Gama
 Taça Guanabara: 2019

Argentina U20
 Pan American Games: 2003

Individual
Coppa Italia top scorer: 2017–18 (4 goals)

References

External links

 European Champions Cup/UEFA Champions League Winning Squads

Profile and statistics at FootballDatabase 
Guardian statistics
Maxi López – Argentine Primera statistics at Fútbol XXI 

1984 births
Living people
Argentine people of Italian descent
Footballers from Buenos Aires
Argentine footballers
Association football forwards
Club Atlético River Plate footballers
FC Barcelona players
RCD Mallorca players
FC Moscow players
Grêmio Foot-Ball Porto Alegrense players
Catania S.S.D. players
A.C. Milan players
U.C. Sampdoria players
A.C. ChievoVerona players
Torino F.C. players
Udinese Calcio players
CR Vasco da Gama players
F.C. Crotone players
A.S. Sambenedettese players
Argentine Primera División players
La Liga players
Russian Premier League players
Campeonato Brasileiro Série A players
Serie A players
Serie B players
UEFA Champions League winning players
Argentina youth international footballers
Argentina under-20 international footballers
Footballers at the 2003 Pan American Games
Pan American Games gold medalists for Argentina
Pan American Games medalists in football
Argentine expatriate footballers
Argentine expatriate sportspeople in Spain
Argentine expatriate sportspeople in Russia
Argentine expatriate sportspeople in Brazil
Argentine expatriate sportspeople in Italy
Expatriate footballers in Spain
Expatriate footballers in Russia
Expatriate footballers in Brazil
Expatriate footballers in Italy
Argentine emigrants to Italy
Citizens of Italy through descent
Internet memes
Medalists at the 2003 Pan American Games